Friston Forest is a forest, located between Seaford and Eastbourne in East Sussex. It is part of the South Downs National Park area. The forest is managed by  Forestry England and covers an area of 2.79 square kilometres, or 278.73 ha.

History 
Friston Forest was planted in the 1930–40s by the Forestry Commission. The most common species of tree planted was beech, because of the chalk and limestone soil.

See also 

 List of forests in the United Kingdom

References 

Forests and woodlands of East Sussex